Iraklis Rugby Club is a Greek rugby club in Thessaloniki. As the name implies, it forms part of the G.S. Iraklis Thessaloniki sports club.

Titles
Greek Championship Rugby Union (1): 2013

External links
Iraklis Rugby

Rugby clubs established in 2005
Greek rugby union teams
Iraklis Thessaloniki
Sports clubs in Thessaloniki